Super Bowl XII was an American football game between the National Football Conference (NFC) champion Dallas Cowboys and the American Football Conference (AFC) champion Denver Broncos to decide the National Football League (NFL) champion for the 1977 season. The Cowboys defeated the Broncos 27–10 to win their second Super Bowl. The game was played on January 15, 1978, at the Louisiana Superdome in New Orleans. This was the first Super Bowl in a domed stadium, and the first time that the game was played in prime time in the Eastern United States.

The game pitted Cowboys quarterback Roger Staubach against their former quarterback, Craig Morton. Led by Staubach and the Doomsday Defense, Dallas advanced to its fourth Super Bowl after posting a 12–2 record in the regular season and home playoff victories over the Chicago Bears and Minnesota Vikings. The Broncos, led by Morton and the Orange Crush Defense, made their first-ever postseason appearance after a franchise-best 12–2 regular season record. Also with home-field advantage, Denver posted playoff wins over the Pittsburgh Steelers and Oakland Raiders.

The Cowboys defense dominated Super Bowl XII, forcing eight turnovers and allowing only eight pass completions by the Broncos for 61 yards. Two interceptions led to 10 first-quarter points. Denver's longest play of the game was 21 yards, which occurred on their opening drive. Dallas extended its lead to 20–3 in the third quarter after wide receiver Butch Johnson made a diving catch in the end zone for a 45-yard touchdown reception. An ineffective Morton was replaced by Norris Weese late in the third quarter. He drove the Broncos downfield to score a touchdown to close the gap on the lead to 20–10, capped by a Rob Lytle one-yard touchdown run. However, the Cowboys put the game out of reach in the fourth quarter when fullback Robert Newhouse threw a 29-yard touchdown pass on a halfback option play to receiver Golden Richards.

For the first and only time, two players won Super Bowl MVP honors: defensive tackle Randy White and defensive end Harvey Martin. This was also the first time that a defensive lineman was named Super Bowl MVP.

Background
The NFL awarded Super Bowl XII to New Orleans on March 16, 1976, at the owners' meetings held in San Diego. It was the first of seven Super Bowls (as of 2022) to be played at the Louisiana Superdome. However, it was not the first one scheduled for the Superdome; Super Bowl IX was scheduled to be played there, but construction delays forced it to be played at Tulane Stadium.

A total of six cities submitted bids: New Orleans, Miami, Pasadena (Rose Bowl), Los Angeles (Coliseum), Dallas, and Houston. However, Dallas dropped out of the running due to a date conflict with a convention. A favorite going into the vote, New Orleans won on the fourth ballot after representatives promised they would prevent price gouging by the local hotels. In selecting the Superdome, owners rejected maintaining an AFC/NFC host site rotation, an unofficial, and mostly coincidental pattern that had been in place for several seasons.

Staubach v. Morton
The main storyline surrounding Super Bowl XII was Cowboys quarterback Roger Staubach versus Broncos quarterback Craig Morton. Morton began his career playing for Dallas in 1965. Staubach joined the Cowboys in 1969 after four years of service in the U.S. Navy, and soon both quarterbacks competed for the starting job. During the 1970 season, both Morton and Staubach started for about half of the regular season games. Morton was ultimately selected to lead the team through the playoffs and eventually to their Super Bowl V loss to the Baltimore Colts, 16–13. The next year, Staubach won the starting job and eventually led Dallas to defeat the Miami Dolphins in Super Bowl VI, 24–3. Staubach was also named Super Bowl MVP during that game. In 1972, Morton started most of the Cowboys' games as Staubach was out with a separated shoulder. However, in the division playoffs against San Francisco, Staubach relieved Morton and rallied the team to victory, which assured Staubach of the starting job going forward.  Morton was relegated to backup status until he left the team in 1974 to join the New York Giants.

Morton and the Broncos' Orange Crush Defense

After spending three years with the Giants, Morton became the starting quarterback for the Broncos, a franchise with a dismal history.  It had taken them 14 years (1960–1973) to record their first winning season and they had never once made the playoffs.  But under the leadership of the newly arrived Morton and their new coach Red Miller, Denver finished 1977 with a 12–2 record and earned the #1 seed in the AFC.

Morton did not put up a large number of passing yards (1,929) during the regular season, but he threw 14 touchdown passes and only 8 interceptions, while also rushing for 125 yards and 4 touchdowns, earning him the NFL Comeback Player of the Year Award. Denver tight end Riley Odoms was his main target, with 37 receptions for 429 yards. Wide receiver Haven Moses was also a major deep threat, catching 27 passes for 539 yards, an average of 20 yards per catch. However, the Broncos main offensive strength was their rushing game. Denver had 3 running backs, Otis Armstrong, Lonnie Perrin, and Rob Lytle, who carried the ball equally, combining for 1,353 rushing yards and 10 touchdowns.  On special teams, multi-talented wide receiver Rick Upchurch led the NFL with 653 punt return yards, while also catching 12 passes for 245 yards and recording 456 yards returning kickoffs.

The backbone of the Broncos was their defense, a unit known as the "Orange Crush", which used a 3–4 formation anchored by four superb linebackers, including Randy Gradishar (3 interceptions, 4 fumble recoveries) and Tom Jackson (4 interceptions, 93 return yards, 1 touchdown). Defensive End Lyle Alzado anchored the line, while their secondary was led by defensive backs Bill Thompson (who recorded 5 interceptions) and Louis Wright (who had 3 interceptions).  The Broncos defense had given up just 148 points during the season, an average of just 10.6 per game and the 3rd-fewest in the NFL.

Staubach and the Cowboys' Doomsday Defense

With Staubach and his team's Doomsday Defense, the Cowboys won the NFC East with a 12–2 regular season record.

Staubach threw for 2,620 yards and 18 touchdowns with only 8 interceptions, while also gaining 171 rushing yards and 3 touchdowns on the ground.  Wide receiver Drew Pearson was the leading receiver on the team with 48 receptions for 870 yards, while Pro Bowl tight end Billy Joe DuPree recorded 28 receptions for 347 yards and provided blocking support on running plays.

The Cowboys also had a new weapon on offense: rookie running back Tony Dorsett, the previous year's Heisman Trophy winner. Despite not becoming a full-time starter until the tenth game of the regular season, Dorsett led the team in rushing with 1,007 yards, scored 13 total touchdowns, and was the team's third leading receiver with 29 receptions for another 273 yards. Veteran fullback Robert Newhouse provided Dorsett with blocking, and was the team's second leading rusher with 721 yards, while also catching 16 passes for another 106 yards. Running back Preston Pearson contributed 341 yards rushing, caught 46 passes for 535 yards, and scored 5 touchdowns.  The Cowboys' offensive line was led by All-Pro tackle Rayfield Wright.

Meanwhile, the Cowboys' Doomsday Defense remained in the superb form that helped lead the Cowboys' Super Bowl X appearance.  Their defensive line consisted of Harvey Martin (who recorded 20 sacks and earned the National Football League Defensive Player of the Year Award), Jethro Pugh, Ed "Too Tall" Jones and Randy White.  Behind them, the Cowboys had a trio of linebackers, Thomas Henderson (3 interceptions), D.D. Lewis, and Bob Breunig, who provided pass coverage and run stoppage. Dallas also had a secondary led by future Hall of Famers cornerback Mel Renfro and safety Cliff Harris and Pro Bowl safety Charlie Waters.

Playoffs

The Cowboys earned their second trip to the Super Bowl in three years by defeating the Chicago Bears, 37–7, and the Minnesota Vikings, 23–6, in the playoffs.  Their "Doomsday Defense" proved as dominant as ever in those two games, forcing 7 turnovers against Chicago and 4 against the Vikings.

Meanwhile, the Broncos earned their first ever trip to the Super Bowl in team history by defeating the two previous league champions: the Pittsburgh Steelers, 34–21, and the Oakland Raiders, 20–17, in the playoffs. This made Morton the first quarterback to start a Super Bowl game for two different franchises (as of Super Bowl LVI, three other quarterbacks - Kurt Warner with the St. Louis Rams and Arizona Cardinals, Peyton Manning with the Indianapolis Colts and Denver Broncos, and Tom Brady with the New England Patriots and Tampa Bay Buccaneers - also accomplished the feat). Morton is also the only quarterback to have started two different franchises' first Super Bowl appearances.

This was the final Super Bowl in the 14-game schedule era.  The following season, the NFL went to a 16-game schedule, which remained in place through the 2020 NFL season.

Super Bowl pregame news and notes
Super Bowl XII provided an opportunity for Morton to not only beat his former team, but also to redeem himself for his Super Bowl V loss and the loss of his starting job to Staubach. For Staubach, he had a chance to win his second Super Bowl and defeat his old rival, showing that he truly was the better quarterback of the two.

Tony Dorsett became the first football player in history to win an NCAA National Championship one year (with the University of Pittsburgh Panthers) and a Super Bowl the next.  Dorsett won both championships in the same building; Pitt clinched the 1976 national championship by defeating the Georgia Bulldogs in the Sugar Bowl on January 1, 1977.

Dallas was the only NFC team to win the Super Bowl in the 1970s (although both Baltimore and Pittsburgh were pre-merger NFL teams). Both Cowboy victories in the decade came in New Orleans against teams making their first Super Bowl appearance.

This was the first Super Bowl between two teams who had met in regular season play. The Cowboys defeated the Broncos 14–6 on the final Sunday of the regular season at Texas Stadium. Both teams' starters saw limited action in that contest, since both squads had already clinched their respective division championships and home-field advantage throughout the playoffs. Denver was 12–1 and Dallas 11–2 prior to the Dec 18 matchup. It was the first of only two times that  two teams have played each other in the Super Bowl after playing on the final weekend of the regular season (the New York Giants and New England Patriots played in the final week of the 2007 regular season and met again in Super Bowl XLII).  Under NFL scheduling rules put in place by Commissioner Roger Goodell prior to the 2010 season, the Super Bowl participants will no longer be able to play each other on the final weekend of the regular season, since all games on the final weekend now match division opponents.

This was the first Super Bowl to feature arrow markers every ten yards, beginning at the 10 yard line, to indicate the direction of the nearest goal line, which were first used at Kansas City's Arrowhead Stadium in 1973. They became mandatory league-wide the following season in 1978.

Broadcasting
The game, the first Super Bowl to be played in prime time, was broadcast in the United States by CBS with play-by-play announcer Pat Summerall and color commentator Tom Brookshier. The game kicked off at 5:17 p.m. Central Standard Time. Hosting the coverage was The NFL Today hosts Brent Musburger; Irv Cross; Phyllis George (in the last game of her first stint on The NFL Today before leaving to host the short-lived People the following season). Also contributing were Hank Stram (who had recently been fired by the New Orleans Saints); Jimmy "The Greek" Snyder; Sonny Jurgensen (working on CBS Radio coverage); Gary Bender; Paul Hornung; Nick Buoniconti and Jack Whitaker. Buoniconti and Hornung served as sideline reporters; with Hornung doing postgame interviews in the Broncos' locker room; while Bender covered the trophy presentation in the Cowboy locker room.

An interesting aspect was the use of what was called an Electronic Palette graphics system (created by CBS and Ampex) for a painting-like aspect to several visual graphics; such as the game intro, starting lineups and bumpers going into or coming out of a commercial break. These graphics were done by sports artist LeRoy Neiman. CBS would also unveil what was known as the "Action Track"; showing the trail of a football that had been kicked during replays. Also, when the planned lead-in (the Phoenix Open golf tournament) was halted due to poor weather, CBS Sports president Robert Wussler (in New York) and producer Barry Frank (at the Superdome) ended up filling the time period with an impromptu look at how the game would be produced.

As in their previous Super Bowl; CBS used the Frank Sinatra song "Winners" to play over the closing montage.

This game was featured in the All in the Family episode "Superbowl Sunday". Archie Bunker rented a big screen TV at his bar "Archie's Place" and sold ham sandwiches for $1.50. Later, two crooks (who were incognito throughout the episode) steal from and humiliate the patrons, following the end of the game. Also, clips of some of the Cowboys' scoring plays were used to accompany the opening credits of the 1979 TV movie Dallas Cowboys Cheerleaders.  Additional clips of this game also appeared in the NFL's Greatest Games episode Doomsday at the Dome.

Entertainment
The pregame festivities featured the Southern University Band along with the cheerleaders of both teams. Later, Phyllis Kelly of Northeast Louisiana University sang the national anthem.

Pro Football Hall of Fame running back Red Grange participated in the coin toss ceremony. Prior to 1976, the official coin toss was held 30 minutes prior to kickoff and was re-enacted three minutes prior to kickoff to inform the television audience and spectators in the stadium of the outcome.

The halftime show was "From Paris to Paris of America" featuring performances by the Apache Band and Apache Belles Drill team from Tyler Junior College, clarinetist Pete Fountain, and trumpeter Al Hirt.

Game summary

First quarter
The opening stages of Super Bowl XII were nearly disastrous for the Cowboys, who fumbled three times on their first two possessions. On their first play from scrimmage, the Cowboys attempted a double reverse, but receiver Butch Johnson fumbled the handoff. Johnson recovered his own fumble but the Cowboys sustained a significant loss on the play and punted two plays later. The Broncos then advanced to the Cowboys' 33-yard line on their first drive of the game. However, Broncos quarterback Craig Morton was sacked for an 11-yard loss on third down by Randy White, which pushed the Broncos out of field goal range. On the ensuing Denver punt, Cowboys returner Tony Hill muffed the ball at his own 1-yard line. In the scramble to recover, Broncos receiver John Schultz placed both of his hands on the ball and nearly took possession, but the Cowboys emerged from the melee with the ball. A few plays later, from the 19-yard line, Dallas running back Tony Dorsett fumbled the ball forward into heavy traffic, but center John Fitzgerald made the recovery to keep possession for the Cowboys, who then punted.

On the Broncos second possession, Cowboys defensive linemen White and Harvey Martin simultaneously hit Morton as he attempted to throw, which resulted in a wobbly pass that failed to cross the line of scrimmage and was intercepted by defensive back Randy Hughes on the Denver 25-yard line. Five plays after the turnover, Dorsett scored on a 3-yard touchdown run, converting on a fourth and goal attempt. On the Broncos next possession, Morton was intercepted for a second time after his pass was tipped by linebacker Bob Breunig into the arms of defensive back Aaron Kyle, who returned the ball 19 yards to Denver's 35-yard line. Dallas then advanced to the 8-yard line, but Cowboys quarterback Roger Staubach was sacked by Lyle Alzado for a 10-yard loss on third down, forcing the Cowboys to settle for a 35-yard Efrén Herrera field goal to increase their lead to 10–0.

Second quarter
Denver was forced to punt to begin the second quarter, and Dallas then advanced to the Broncos' 19-yard line. On third down, Staubach unleashed a pass that was intercepted in the end zone; however, the officials ruled that he had stepped out of bounds before he threw the ball. On the next play, Herrera successfully added a 43-yard field goal to increase the Cowboys' lead to 13–0. The rest of the quarter was filled with an avalanche of sloppy play, turnovers, and missed opportunities. On the second play of the next Denver drive, Morton unleashed an errant pass for his third interception, this time by defensive back Benny Barnes at the Cowboys' 40-yard line. The Denver defense immediately stiffened, sacking Staubach for a fourth time and forcing a three-and-out and a punt. However, the punt struck an unsuspecting Denver player, John Schultz, on his helmet as he attempted to throw a block during the return, and the ball was quickly recovered by the Cowboys' Bruce Huther.

The Cowboys then advanced to the 26-yard line, but Herrera pulled his 43-yard field goal attempt wide left, keeping the score 13–0. On the following drive the Broncos committed their fifth turnover as wide receiver Jack Dolbin fumbled, with Hughes returned the ball 19 yards to the Denver 27-yard line. However, the Cowboys failed to score as Herrera missed another field goal, this time from only 32 yards out. On the first play after that missed attempt, Denver wasted no time in giving the ball away again, as tight end Riley Odoms fumbled the ball back to Dallas, with Hughes recovering it and returning it to the 28-yard line. However, on the next play, Dallas gave the ball right back to Denver as tight end Billy Joe DuPree caught a pass inside the 10-yard line but fumbled, with Denver linebacker Tom Jackson making the recovery. Five plays later, with the Broncos desperate to score before the half, Morton uncorked yet another errant pass that was intercepted by defensive back Mark Washington who returned the ball 27 yards to Denver's 35-yard line. There were 6 seconds remaining on the clock after the interception, but Dallas couldn't capitalize as Herrera missed yet another field goal attempt, his third miss of the half, this time from 44 yards out as time expired.

By halftime, the Cowboys had fumbled five times (losing one), had missed three field goals, and had allowed four sacks, but still led 13–0. Meanwhile, the Broncos had committed a halftime record 7 turnovers. Morton, who had thrown only 8 interceptions during the entire 1977 season, was picked off 4 times in the half in addition to 3 fumbles lost, finishing with a passer rating of 0.0. Incredibly, after punting on their very first drive of the game, six of the next seven Broncos possessions resulted in a turnover, and there also was a fumble on a punt return.

Third quarter
Denver trailed by only 13 points as the second half began, and on the opening drive of the second half, the Broncos moved the ball deep into Dallas territory.  First, John Schultz returned the second half kickoff 25 yards to the 35-yard line, and then Otis Armstrong ripped off an 18-yard gain.  Seven plays later, Jim Turner finished the drive with a 47-yard field goal, cutting the score to 13–3.  But later in the period, the Cowboys scored another touchdown on a 45-yard pass from Staubach to receiver Butch Johnson, who made a fingertip catch as he fell into the end zone as the Cowboys increased their lead to 20–3.  Johnson dropped the ball when he hit the ground, but officials ruled he had scored a touchdown before it came out of his hands.

Denver wide receiver Rick Upchurch returned the ensuing kickoff a Super Bowl-record 67 yards to the Cowboys 26-yard line.  On the next play, Morton nearly threw his fifth interception, and was then immediately replaced by former Ole Miss quarterback Norris Weese.  Two plays later on fourth down, Jim Jensen's 16-yard run moved the ball to the 1-yard line, and then Rob Lytle scored on a 1-yard touchdown run to cut the deficit to 20–10.

Fourth quarter
Next, Dallas drove into Denver territory but Staubach was sacked by Tom Jackson and lost the ball, Rubin Carter recovering at the Broncos' 45 early in the fourth quarter. Weese was incomplete on his next three attempts, however, one on a pass to Upchurch in the end zone, and Denver punted.

The Broncos forced a Dallas punt but Weese fumbled the ball while being sacked by Martin, and Kyle recovered it on the Denver 29-yard line.  On the next play, the Cowboys scored on a 29-yard halfback option play: Staubach pitched the ball to fullback Robert Newhouse, who ran left and then threw a pass to back-up receiver Golden Richards for a touchdown. The score gave the Cowboys a 27–10 lead and put the game out of reach. Newhouse became the first running back in Super Bowl history to complete a touchdown pass.  Most notable about the trick play was that Denver's defense was not fooled by it, as Richards was properly covered by defensive back Steve Foley. Incidentally, Newhouse had practiced with the play for weeks but had not managed to complete the pass once in practice (which unlike the play in the game was done with Newhouse rolling to his right). Loaded up with stickum (legal at the time), Newhouse accomplished a tight spiral to Richards that he caught in stride for the score.

Staubach finished the game with 17 out of 25 pass completions for 183 yards and a touchdown, with no interceptions.  Dorsett was the leading rusher of the game, with 66 rushing yards and a touchdown.  He also caught 2 passes for 11 receiving yards.  In addition to his 29-yard touchdown pass, Newhouse also contributed with 55 rushing yards. Dallas tight end Billy Joe DuPree was the leading receiver of the game with 4 receptions for 66 yards.  Hughes had an interception and a Super Bowl record 2 fumble recoveries.

Before being taken out of the game, Denver's starting quarterback Craig Morton completed just 4 out of 15 passes for 39 yards and was intercepted 4 times. His 21-yard completion to Haven Moses on the Broncos' opening drive was the only pass he completed that both resulted in positive yardage and did not end in a turnover. Morton's passer rating for the game was 0.0, the lowest in Super Bowl history. Upchurch recorded 125 total offensive yards (94 on kickoff returns, 22 on punt returns, and 9 receiving yards).

The Cowboys' superb defense played a critical role in the game. White and Martin were named co-Most Valuable Players; this award is usually bestowed on an offensive player. The voters actually wanted to name the entire 11-man starting defensive lineup as co-MVPs, and asked the NFL if this was acceptable. The league said no, and so two players were picked for the award. The unheralded Hughes and Kyle of the Cowboy secondary each had superb games to play an important role in the victory. The two men came up with five turnovers between them, leading directly to 17 of Dallas' points.

The game was the 8th Super Bowl in 10 years in which the winning team scored enough to win before the losing team put up any points on the board. By contrast, this has happened only four times since, in Super Bowls XV, XVIII, XXXV, and XLVIII.

In 2015, on the occasion of Super Bowl 50, Slate webpage writer Justin Peters watched all the games over a two-month period. He considered Super Bowl XII to be the worst Super Bowl ever. Morton was a large part of the reason for Peters, who felt the Broncos' quarterback was lucky to have only been intercepted four times in the first half, and a total output that amounted to only one completion for positive yardage that was not followed by an immediate turnover. Nor had the Cowboys impressed him, in large part due to Herrera's missed field goals in the second quarter. "Blowouts can at least be fun to watch sometimes", he concluded. "This game was nothing but pain."

Box score

Final statistics
Sources: NFL.com Super Bowl XII, Super Bowl XII Play Finder Dal, Super Bowl XII Play Finder Den

Statistical comparison

Individual statistics

1Completions/attempts
2Carries
3Long gain
4Receptions
5Times targeted

Records set
The following records were set in Super Bowl XII, according to the official NFL.com boxscore and the ProFootball reference.com game summary. Some records have to meet NFL minimum number of attempts to be recognized. The minimums are shown (in parenthesis).
 

 ‡ Sacks an official statistic since Super Bowl XVII by the NFL. Sacks are listed as "Tackled Attempting to Pass" in the official NFL box score for Super Bowl XII.

Turnovers are defined as the number of times losing the ball on interceptions and fumbles.

Starting lineups
Source:

Officials
 Referee: Jim Tunney #32 third Super Bowl (VI, XI)
 Umpire: Joe Connell #57 third Super Bowl (VI, X)
 Head Linesman: Tony Veteri #36 third Super Bowl (II, VII)
 Line Judge: Art Holst #33 second Super Bowl (VI)
 Back Judge: Ray Douglas #5 second Super Bowl (IX)
 Field Judge: Bob Wortman #84 second Super Bowl (VI)
 Alternate Referee: Cal Lepore #72 worked Super Bowl III as line judge
 Alternate Umpire: Frank Sinkovitz #20 would work Super Bowl XV

Note: A seven-official system was not used until the following season

Jim Tunney was the only referee to work consecutive Super Bowls. The NFL now prohibits referees from working Super Bowls in consecutive seasons (a referee can be an alternate the season following an on-field assignment), although officials at other positions can do so.

This was the first Super Bowl in which all officials had previously called one.

Five of the six officials—all except Veteri—previously worked a Super Bowl in New Orleans. Of those five, only Douglas was not on the crew for Super Bowl VI at Tulane Stadium.

References

Sources
 
 Super Bowl official website
 
 
 
 
 https://www.pro-football-reference.com – Large online database of NFL data and statistics
 Super Bowl play-by-plays from USA Today (Last accessed October 6, 2015)
 Sports Illustrated Archives – Super Bowl XII

Dallas Cowboys postseason
Denver Broncos postseason
Super Bowl
1977 National Football League season
1978 in American football
American football competitions in New Orleans
1978 in sports in Louisiana
January 1978 sports events in the United States
1970s in New Orleans